Walter John Edwards (born 23 December 1949) is a former Australian cricketer who played in three Test matches and one One Day International in 1974 and 1975.

He has maintained his links with Australian cricket since retirement, being the vice-president of the Western Australian Cricket Association since 2000 (receiving life membership in 2002) as well as being on the board of Cricket Australia for the past 11 years. He was elected chairman of Cricket Australia in 2011 serving until his resignation in 2015. He was replaced as chairman by David Peever.

Outside of cricket Edwards owns a company that manufactures irrigation products.

References

External links 

1949 births
Living people
Australia Test cricketers
Australia One Day International cricketers
Western Australia cricketers
Australian cricketers
Sportsmen from Western Australia
Cricketers from Perth, Western Australia